Imagination Games is a multi-platform game company that creates, produces and distributes interactive entertainment.

History

Imagination Game is a subsidiary of Imagination Entertainment and part of the Imagination Group of Companies.

Imagination is a global games and media company with offices and distribution in United States, Canada, United Kingdom, Europe, Australia and New Zealand. Imagination manages a portfolio of companies and investments that range from Aviation to Property. Imagination was awarded Most Innovative Company in America under 2000 employees and the same year Most Innovative Company in Asia Pacific under 2000 employees. Imagination’s Co-founder and CEO awarded Deloitte Innovator of the Year in 2002 and was Ernst & Young Australian Entrepreneur of the Year in 2007.

Imagination Ventures has donated more than $7 million to charities in Australia since 2004, with over $5 million going to the McGuiness McDermott foundation for Women’s & Children’s Hospital projects in South Australia. In 2012, Imagination purchased the rights to Humphrey B Bear, one of Australia’s longest running Children’s Preschool Properties. The much-loved bear has been signed on to become the Women's & Children's Foundation's "Ambassabear".

References

External links 
 http://www.americanexpress.com/australia/pdfs/BEXP_Online_Cover-Story.pdf
 http://gamesindustry.biz/press_release.php?aid=12941
 http://www.imaginationgames.com
 http://www.austrade.gov.au/A-little-Imagination-goes-a-long-way-/default.aspx
 http://boardgames.about.com/b/a/257447.htm?terms=imagination+games
 Forbes.com
 http://www.toynewsmag.com/news/28856/Imagination-catches-Catchphrase
 http://www.heraldsun.com.au/entertainment/hooray-humphrey-b-bear-is-back/story-e6frf96f-1226339174981
 http://city-messenger.whereilive.com.au/news/story/north-adelaide-hospital-fundraiser/
 http://www.adelaidenow.com.au/entertainment/humphrey-b-bear-is-back-out-of-hibernation/story-e6fredpu-1226339281391

Australian companies established in 1984
Game manufacturers
Manufacturing companies based in Adelaide
Entertainment companies of Australia